Anki (stylized as "anki") was an American robotics and artificial intelligence startup that put robotics technology in products for children. Anki programmed physical objects to be intelligent and adaptable in the physical world, and aimed to solve the problems of positioning, reasoning, and execution in artificial intelligence and robotics.

The company debuted Anki Drive during the 2013 Apple Worldwide Developers Conference keynote.

The company received $50 million in Series A and Series B venture funding from Andreessen Horowitz, Index Ventures, and Two Sigma. In September 2014, Anki announced that it has raised another $55 million in Series C venture funding led by JP Morgan. In June 2016, the company announced its latest round of funding, which amounted to $52.5M, also led by JP Morgan. Total funding to date is $182.5 million. Marc Andreessen and Danny Rimer serve on the company's board, in addition to the three co-founders.

It went bankrupt in April 2019 and shut down the following month.

In December 2019, Anki assets, including OVERDRIVE, Cozmo, and Vector, were acquired by Digital Dream Labs.

History
Anki was founded by Boris Sofman, Mark Palatucci, and Hanns Tappeiner, founded officially in 2010 and was headquartered in San Francisco. It also had locations in Europe. (Anki Germany GmbH )

Products

Anki Drive and Anki OVERDRIVE 
Anki's first product, Anki Drive, was released in Apple stores in the U.S. and Canada, on Apple.com and Anki.com starting October 23, 2013. It retailed for $149.99, with additional cars available for $49.99 and Expansion Tracks for $69.99
Anki Drive is a racing game that combined an iOS app, called "Anki Drive," with physical race cars. Each car is equipped with optical sensors, wireless chips, motors, and artificial intelligence software. Anki OVERDRIVE, an upgraded version of Drive with different cars and modular tracks, was released in September 2015.

Cozmo 

In October 2016, Anki launched Cozmo in the US. Cozmo is a robot about 4 inches by 3 by 2 inches. It is mostly white, with red details, and gray on the end of its robot arm. There is a light on top of its body, with a gray border, which can shine different colors. A "collector's edition" Cozmo was released in 2017, with a "Liquid Metal" smoked gray chrome finish. A "limited edition" Cozmo, with an "Interstellar Blue" blue, white, and gray finish, was released in 2018.

Cozmo comes with three illuminated cubes it communicates with in order to play games and can autonomously move, lift and roll the cubes, and the cubes are powered by LR1, N, AM5, E90, batteries for power.
Production of Cozmo ceased in May 2019 when Anki shutdown due to lack of funding.

Vector 

In August 2018, Anki launched Vector. It was designed to be more helpful, instead of being purely a toy. It is approximately the same size as Cozmo, and its design and shape is essentially the same, except Vector is mostly black with gray details and has a gold border around its light on top, which shines green by default, blue when waiting for a voice command, red when muted, white when thinking, and slowly flashing orange when experiencing Wi-Fi connection difficulties. Vector uses an array of 4 beaming microphones to find out exactly where you are, as well as a gold touchpad where it can be petted. Vector has facial recognition technology and can respond to voice commands. It is cloud-connected and will update automatically. Its first major update came out on December 17, 2018, which allowed Vector to connect to Amazon Alexa.

References

External links
 Official site

2010 establishments in California
2019 disestablishments in California
Companies based in San Francisco
Defunct robotics companies of the United States
Technology companies disestablished in 2019
Technology companies established in 2010